Malmyzhsky District is an administrative and municipal district (raion), one of the thirty-nine in Kirov Oblast, Russia. It is located in the south of the oblast. Its administrative center is the town of Malmyzh. Population:  32,070 (2002 Census);  The population of Malmyzh accounts for 30.9% of the district's total population.

References

Sources

Districts of Kirov Oblast